Orlando is a fictional character and one of the male leads in the comedy As You Like It (1599/1600) by William Shakespeare.

Orlando is the youngest son of the deceased Sir Rowland de Bois and is the brother of Oliver. He is brave, chivalrous, tender, modest, smart, strong, and handsome. He resents the harsh treatment he receives at Oliver's hands and laments how Oliver has denied him an education and the money he is rightfully owed. Nevertheless, he is successful in expressing his love for Rosalind to her before he escapes to the Forest of Arden with his servant Adam.

At the start of the play, Orlando is indignant over the harsh treatment of his brother Oliver, though unaware of Oliver's plot to kill him during a wrestling match. Though he wins the match he angers Duke Frederick, and therefore he flees the court to live in the Forest of Arden. There, he is accepted into the circle of the usurped Duke Senior and begins to find freedom in life in the forest. A more poetic side to him comes out as he leaves poems on trees to Rosalind. When Rosalind sees these poems she strikes up a relationship with him as Ganymede, and the two act out a relationship between Orlando and Rosalind under the guise that it will cure Orlando of his love for her. By the end of the story he is married to Rosalind and reinstated in his wealth and station.

He is portrayed as exceptionally strong in both body and in his devotion to love. It is these qualities that make Rosalind fall in love with him.

Laurence Olivier played the character in a 1936 film adaptation of the play with Elizabeth Bergner opposite him as Rosalind.

References

Male Shakespearean characters
Literary characters introduced in 1600
Fictional nobility
As You Like It